Wundacaenis is a genus of small squaregilled mayflies in the family Caenidae. There are at least three described species in Wundacaenis.

Species
These three species belong to the genus Wundacaenis:
 Wundacaenis angulata Suter, 1993
 Wundacaenis dostini Suter, 1993
 Wundacaenis flabellum Suter, 1993

References

Further reading

 
 

Mayflies
Articles created by Qbugbot